Club Sportiv Minaur Baia Mare, commonly known as CS Minaur Baia Mare, Minaur Baia Mare or simply as Minaur, is a Romanian sports society from Baia Mare, Romania, founded in 1974 by Lascăr Pană, after he took over the old entity (Minerul) in 1970. The club went bankrupt during early 2010s and was re-founded in 2015.

Men's Handball section 

The men's handball section of Minaur is one of the most prestigious and respected handball teams in Romania. Founded in 1974 by Lascăr Pană, men's handball section was the first one of the sports society and over the years won three Romanian Leagues, was ranked second on seven occasions and was on the podium in no less than 17 times. The boys from Minaur also won six Romanian Cups and two EHF Cups.

Women's Handball section 

The women's handball section is part of Minaur only since 2015, year when the club was re-founded after its bankruptcy. The women's handball section was in fact founded on the basis of HCM Baia Mare, club that also went bankrupt in 2016. HCM was one of the oldest sport clubs in Baia Mare, with a tradition that started in 1960, one Romanian League title, 3 Romanian Cups, 3 Romanian Supercups and with notable results in the Women's EHF Champions League, Women's EHF European Cup and Women's EHF Cup Winners' Cup.

Football section 

The football section of Minaur is the newest one, added in the sports society organizational chart only in 2017. Football team of Baia Mare was founded in 1948 as CSM Baia Mare and was for most of its existence a second league member. The most glorious period of "the miners" was at the end of the 1970s, under the command of Viorel Mateianu, at that time they qualified in the UEFA Cup Winners' Cup and played against Real Madrid. In recent years, the football club went bankrupt on two occasions, so after the last one, it went under the umbrella of Minaur.

References

External links 

Sports clubs established in 1974
Multi-sport clubs in Romania
Sport in Baia Mare
Minaur